Wayne Daniels (born April 8, 1987) is an American football defensive end who is currently a free agent. He played college football at TCU. Daniels was a 2010 College All-American selection by the Football Writers Association of America.

Daniels attended Kilgore High School in Texas, where he registered 65 tackles with eight sacks, three quarterback pressures and an interception in his senior year. Regarded as a three-star recruit by Rivals.com, Daniels was listed as the No. 32 strongside defensive end prospect in the class of 2006.

Professional career

New York Jets
After going undrafted, Daniels signed as an undrafted free agent with the New York Jets.

Chicago Rush
Daniels was assigned to the Chicago Rush of the Arena Football League (AFL). On December 6, 2011, he was traded to the Pittsburgh Power, but later placed him on reassignment on March 20, 2012. He was once again assigned to the Rush in March.

Texas Revolution
In December 2012, Daniels signed with the Texas Revolution, an indoor football team in the Indoor Football League.

Nashville Venom
On November 7, 2013, Daniels followed former Revolution Head Coach, Billy Back, to the expansion Nashville Venom of the Professional Indoor Football League. He was waived on March 25, 2015.

References

External links
TCU Horned Frogs bio

1987 births
Living people
American football defensive ends
TCU Horned Frogs football players
New York Jets players
Chicago Rush players
Texas Revolution players
Nashville Venom players
Wichita Falls Nighthawks players
People from Kilgore, Texas